Mamuang kuan, also referred to as preserved mango or mango leather, is a traditional Thai sweet. It is a preparation of dried mango in fruit leather form. Mamuang kuan's shape is slender and delicate, its texture is chewy, and its color is gold. People sometimes make the sweet into a circle, flower, or spiral.

Thai desserts and snacks
Dried fruit